Bakhti-ye Bala (also Romanized as Bakhtī-ye Bālā; also known as Dar Moḩammad, Bakhtī, and Qanāt-e Seyyed Moḩammad) is a village in Birk Rural District, in the Central District of Mehrestan County, Sistan and Baluchestan Province, Iran. At the time of the 2006 census, its population was 81, across 17 families.

References 

Populated places in Mehrestan County